2005 Belarusian First League was the fifteenth season of 2nd level football championship in Belarus. It started in April and ended in November 2005.

Team changes from 2004 season
Two top teams of the last season (Lokomotiv Minsk and Vedrich-97 Rechitsa) were promoted to Belarusian Premier League. They were replaced by two teams that finished at the bottom of 2004 Belarusian Premier League table (Lokomotiv Vitebsk and Belshina Bobruisk).

Two teams that finished at the bottom of 2004 season table (Vertikal Kalinkovichi and Dinamo-Juni Minsk) relegated to the Second League. They were replaced by two best teams of 2004 Second League (Smena Minsk and Orsha).

Vedrich-97 Rechitsa were not able to fulfill Premier League licensing criteria and remained in the First League.

Molodechno-2000 (who finished 13th last season) withdrew to the Second League due to insufficient financing.

Teams and locations

League table

Top goalscorers

See also
2005 Belarusian Premier League
2004–05 Belarusian Cup
2005–06 Belarusian Cup

External links
RSSSF

Belarusian First League seasons
2
Belarus
Belarus